Edson Schuyler "John" Lott II (January 17, 1905 – June 28, 1992) was an American football player. He played at the tackle position in the National Football League (NFL) for the Orange Tornadoes in 1929 and for the Brooklyn Dodgers in 1930. He appeared in four NFL games. Lott died in 1992 at age 87.

References

1905 births
1992 deaths
Brooklyn Dodgers (NFL) players
Players of American football from New York (state)
Orange Tornadoes players